Cantique des cantiques  (Song of Songs) is an EP by French rocker Alain Bashung and his wife Chloé Mons, issued in November 2002 on Barclay Records. They both sang this more-than-25-minutes long song for their wedding in 2001, on a music composed by Rodolphe Burger and with lyrics based on a new translation of the Bible's Song of Songs by the writer Olivier Cadiot.

Reception
French magazine Les Inrocks praised the EP, claiming that "although the concept is worrying", the "miracle, since we're talking about religion, happens" and "the voices of Chloé Mons and Bashung answer themselves with perfection on lyrics of luminous beauty, often very clear [...], sometimes strange".

Track listing

References

2002 albums
Barclay (record label) albums
Alain Bashung albums